is a passenger railway station  located in the city of Yonago, Tottori Prefecture, Japan. It is operated by the West Japan Railway Company (JR West).

Lines

Station layout
There is no station building, and the station is unattended.

History
Kawasakiguchi Station opened on July 1, 1952.

Passenger statistics
In fiscal 2018, the station was used by an average of 406 passengers daily.

Surrounding area
Yonago Hokuto Junior and Senior High School
Yonago Municipal Kawasaki Elementary Schoolol

See also
List of railway stations in Japan

References

External links 

  Kawasakiguchi Station from JR-Odekake.net 

Railway stations in Japan opened in 1952
Railway stations in Tottori Prefecture
Stations of West Japan Railway Company
Yonago, Tottori